The Takpa or Dakpa language, Dakpakha, known in India as Tawang Monpa, also known as Brami in Bhutan, is an East Bodish language spoken in the Tawang district of Arunachal Pradesh, and in northern Trashigang District in eastern Bhutan, mainly in Kyaleng (Shongphu gewog), Phongmed Gewog, Dangpholeng and Lengkhar near Radi Gewog. Van Driem (2001) describes Takpa as the most divergent of Bhutan's East Bodish languages, though it shares many similarities with Bumthang. SIL reports that Takpa may be a dialect of the Brokpa language and that it been influenced by the Dzala language whereas Brokpa has not.

Takpa is mutually unintelligible with Monpa of Zemithang and Monpa of Mago-Thingbu. Monpa of Zemithang is another East Bodish language, and is documented in Abraham, et al. (2018).

Wangchu (2002) reports that Tawang Monpa is spoken in Lhou, Seru, Lemberdung, and Changprong villages, Tawang District, Arunachal Pradesh.

Phonology  
These tables represent the phonemes of the variety of Takpa spoken in China, in Tsona County.

Vowels

Consonants 

Monba is a tonal language, with four contour tones: 55, 53, 35, and 31.

See also
Languages of Bhutan

References

External links 
Himalayan Languages Project

East Bodish languages
Languages of Bhutan
Languages of India
Languages of China
Articles citing ISO change requests